is a 2009 Japanese made-for-television short kaiju film directed by Kiyotaka Taguchi. The film stars Kanji Tsuda, Mark Chinnery, Mina Fujii and Kazuhiro Yoshida as Geharha.

Plot 
A gigantic, hairy monster attacks a fishing boat at sea. Dr Murakami suspects that the only survivor of the assault, who has lost all his hair, may be a Keukegen spectre, a shaggy supernatural creature based on Japanese folklore. Hideo Akihara discovers several worshippers and learns that an ancient seal containing the monster has been broken after hearing the announcement at a forest shrine dedicated to the Keukegen Geharha.

While Hideo continues his investigation, Geharha strikes a number of locations in Ishikawa Prefecture, gradually closing in on Kanazawa, the capital. While the Japanese Self Defense Force moves into the city to confront the monster, civilians are evacuated. Geharha's long hair cushions the blows of the armed forces when they attack with tanks and guns. The few wounds that the creature does receive emit a noxious gas that quickly overwhelms the military, forcing the JSDF commander to call for a retreat. A foreign consultant offers a new superweapon to use against Geharha... the Gas Vortical Device "Fujin".

Cast 

 Kanji Tsuda as Fisherman Kubo
 Jiji-Boo as Doctor
 Kazuhiro Yoshida as Geharha
 Ken Osawa as Hideo Hagiwara
 Mina Fujii as Momoko Hagiwara
 Mark Chinery as Dr. Anderson
 Wakana Matsumoto as Signalman
 Keisaku Kimura as Signalman
 Mitsuko Oka as Tsuruko Hagiwara
 Shiro Sano as Dr. Murakami
 Tomorowo Taguchi as Shinto priest
 Kanji Tsuda as Fisherman Kubo
 Hiroyuki Watanabe as JSDF commander
 Pierre Taki as Tank Corps captain
 Terry Ito as Alien
 Akane Oshawa
 Yuri Morishita
 Yukihide Benny

Home media 
On September 30, 2009, King Records released the director's cut on DVD and Blu-ray in Japan.

References

External links 

 Official website (archived)
 

2009 films
Japanese television films
2000s Japanese-language films
2000s Japanese films
Kaiju films
Giant monster films
2009 television films
2000s monster movies